The Space Monkeys are an English alternative band, formed in Middleton, Greater Manchester in 1995. The band consisted of Richard McNevin-Duff, Tony Pipes, Dom Morrison and Chas Morrison. After working with the band for a number years, Neil Walsh (guitar and keyboards) later joined the band.

The band were signed to Factory Records / Factory Too in the UK and Interscope Records in the US. They were often compared to baggy and acid house music. They split up in 2000.

Overview
They released their album, The Daddy of Them All, on 4 November 1997. The single "Sugar Cane" from this album reached 58 on the Billboard chart. The single edit remix of the song was frequently played on American radio in place of the LP version and is available as a separate CD single. The music video for this single was the second video from famed photographer David LaChapelle and featured hip hop legends Rock Steady Crew. The band toured the US and Europe with Smash Mouth and Third Eye Blind. The song "Drug Soup" was recorded especially for and features in the soundtrack of the Gwyneth Paltrow movie Sliding Doors.

The band went on to record a second album, Escape from the 20th Century, which included tracks produced by legendary hip hop producer Prince Paul. However, due to the collapse of Factory Records and other problems, the album was shelved and remained unreleased until 2013. The band disbanded in 2000. McNevin-Duff, Pipes and Walsh went on to release an EP under the guise of "Munki", and Chas Morrison joined avant-garde drum and bass group RSL.

Recent activity
Tony Pipes is now a multi award-winning creative director, working in advertising, broadcasting and design. He is responsible for designing the 11th & 12th Doctor's incarnation of the Doctor Who logo and has worked across brands and advertising for both the BBC and ITV.  He created the original British drama strand for the BBC as well as launching key titles such as Luther and Call the Midwife. He was a key member of the Cannes Lion Winning ITV Rebrand team and became Executive Creative Director for ITV Creative where he ran the in-house advertising agency until 2023. He writes for the stage and TV, with his first play "The Button" being produced and performed as part of the SuperNova 8 Theatre festival.  
He returned to music as The Infamous Beat Thief, releasing the single "StereobookElectronook" in October 2018. In December 2018, he released "Year of the Dog" a new single with Richard McNevin-DufF and continues to release tracks. 
He returned to the band in 2022, performing at a 25th Anniversary show for the "Daddy of Them All" at Gorilla, Manchester. 

Richard McNevin-Duff has recently returned to music with his band "Giant Star" which alongside full-time members John Whittaker and James Ritchie also features guest appearances from friends from the Manchester music scene such as Denise Johnson, Robbie Maddix and Barrington Stewart. "Giant Star" release debut album "Year Of The Snake" in 2013. He is also scheduled to appear at FC United of Manchester's much lauded 'club night in the afternoon' Course You Can Malcom on Saturday 25 January 2014, where he will be performing an acoustic Space Monkeys set.
He currently tours as "Space Monkeys" with a new line up. Chas Morrison is the only other original member. 
They are set to release an album of new music in 2018, via Pledge Music.

Dom Morrison made headlines in the tabloids in 2010 following his involvement in a bare knuckle boxing match with ex-Happy Mondays dancer Bez.

Reformation
The band reformed in 2015 to play a series of shows. The sets consisted of songs from The Daddy Of Them All. This was the original line up, excluding Tony Pipes, who chose not to participate. More recently, the band have continued to play festivals and one-off shows across Europe. They have also announced they are recording a new album scheduled for release in 2018.

Discography
Studio albums
 The Daddy of Them All (1997)
 Escape from the 20th Century (2013)
 Modern Actions (2020)

References

External links
Factory Records site
David LaChapelle
Pride of Manchester
Tony Pipes' Blog
NME article about Bez v Dom Boxing match

Musical groups from Manchester
English alternative rock groups
Factory Records artists